
Year 130 BC was a year of the pre-Julian Roman calendar. At the time it was known as the Year of the Consulship of Lentulus/Pulcher and Perperna (or, less frequently, year 624 Ab urbe condita) and the Fifth Year of Yuanguang. The denomination 130 BC for this year has been used since the early medieval period, when the Anno Domini calendar era became the prevalent method in Europe for naming years.

Events 
 By place 

 Roman Republic 
 Consul Marcus Perperna defeats Aristonicus in battle, besieges him at Stratonicea, dies at Pergamon.
 Roman census carried out by Quintus Pompeius and Quintus Caecilius Metellus Macedonicus. 
 Egypt 
 King Ptolemy VIII murders Ptolemy Memphites, the puppet ruler of Cleopatra II. 

 China 
 Concubine Wei Zifu gives birth to Liu Ju, the future Crown Prince.

Births 
 Publius Servilius Vatia Isauricus, Roman consul (approximate date)
 Quintus Caecilius Metellus Pius, Roman consul and general (d. 63 BC) (approximate date)

Deaths 
 Appius Claudius Pulcher, Roman consul 
 Ariarathes V, king of Cappadocia
 Marcus Perperna, Roman consul 
 Pacuvius, Roman tragic poet (b. c. 220 BC) 
 Ptolemaeus of Commagene, Seleucid satrap

References